The 1973–74 Hong Kong First Division League season was the 63rd since its establishment.

League table

References
1973–74 Hong Kong First Division table (RSSSF)

Hong
Hong Kong First Division League seasons
football